Tando is a village (selo) in Botlikhsky District of the  Republic of Dagestan, Russia.

The village was seized by a Chechen guerrilla unit led by Shamil Basayev in August 1999 in the course of the Invasion of Dagestan.

References
 Царь-бомба для электората by Виктор Мясников, Независимая газета (Nezavisimaya Gazeta), 2007-09-14, 
 Report to the United Nations Human Rights Committee for its consideration of the Fifth Periodic Report by the Russian Federation

Rural localities in Botlikhsky District